Overland High School is located in Aurora, Colorado, United States, and is part of the Cherry Creek School District.

Overland High School is a comprehensive public, suburban, college-oriented institution.  It is accredited by the North Central Association of Secondary Schools and Colleges and by the Colorado State Department of Education. Overland High School was selected to be on Newsweeks America's Top High Schools 2010 list.

Construction has been completed on a state-of-the-art Science, Technology, Engineering and Math or IST Center, built on the esplanade between Prairie Middle School and Overland High School. The  center opened in August 2011. It serves 6th through 12th graders. Programming includes areas of concentration in bio-science, computer science, medicine and information technology.

Demographics
The demographic breakdown of the 2,290 students enrolled in 2013-2014 was:
Male - 50.6%
Female - 49.4%
Native American/Alaskan - 0.7
Asian/Pacific islanders - 5.7%
Black - 31.5%
Hispanic - 32.6%
White - 24.3%
Multiracial - 5.2%

Athletics

Baseball
Overland High School won the Colorado 3A State Championship in 1990.

Basketball
The men's basketball team won the Colorado 5A State championship in 2015 and 2016.

Football
Overland High School won the Colorado 6A State Championship in 1993.

Gymnastics
Overland's women's gymnastics team won the Colorado State 5A championship in 2020, 2014, 2013, 2011 and 2009, as well as the 3A  championship in 1984.

Overland's men's gymnastics teams were ranked number 1 in the nation in 1986 and 1987 and won three state gymnastics championships between 1985 and 1987.

Rugby Union
Overland's boys rugby team won the 1989 Rugby Colorado State Premiership title, with an undefeated record. Overland continued rugby until 1996, when the team was renamed as the Aurora Saracens.

Soccer
The men's soccer team won the Colorado State 5A championship in 1995, and the women's team won the 6A State championship in 1992 and 1991.

Track
The women's track team won the Colorado State 6A championship in 1994.

Volleyball
The women's volleyball team won the Colorado State 5A championship in 1994, the 6A championship in 1993 and 1990, and the 4A championship in 1986.

Poms
The Poms team won state in the fall of 2010 and 2011.

Notable alumni

 Scott Bentley,'93, former NFL kicker
 T. J. Cunningham,'91, former NFL safety
 Wade Davis, former NFL football player and gay rights activist
 Eddie Gill, NBA basketball player
 Brian Givens, former MLB player
 John Grahame, '93, ice hockey goaltender
 Brian Kelly, '94, NFL cornerback

 Jeffe Kennedy, author, poet 

 Sean Moran, '91, former NFL defensive end
 Brendan Schaub, '01, former professional mixed martial artist and podcaster
Nathan Dunlap, perpetrator of the 1993 Chuck E. Cheese shooting

 Iman Jodeh, elected in 2020 to represent the 41st district of the Colorado House of Representatives, as its first Muslim member, and was reelected in 2022.

References

External links
 

Public high schools in Colorado
Education in Aurora, Colorado
Cherry Creek School District
Educational institutions established in 1978
Schools in Arapahoe County, Colorado
1978 establishments in Colorado